Daniel Jungwirth (born 15 January 1982) is a German retired footballer.

References

External links
 

1982 births
Living people
German footballers
Germany youth international footballers
Association football midfielders
Borussia Mönchengladbach II players
FC Bayern Munich II players
FC Erzgebirge Aue players
FC Ingolstadt 04 players
SV Sandhausen players
SV Elversberg players
2. Bundesliga players
3. Liga players
Footballers from Munich
FC Unterföhring players